Mōtū River is a major waterway in the eastern portion of the North Island of New Zealand. It rises on the slopes of Maungahaumi on the southern side of the Raukumara Range south of Opotiki, heads east and cuts its way through the range, where its important tributaries merge with it, and empties into the Bay of Plenty to the north.

The Māori name Mōtu means cut off, isolated. This refers to the district around the headwaters, which since ancient times has been considered to be in the middle of nowhere because of the thickness of the forests which surrounded it.

The river passes through mostly uninhabited hill country, very steep and still thickly covered in rainforest. It is much used for adventure tourism (jet-boating and white-water rafting). The first modern traverse of the river, from the Motu Falls to its mouth, was in 1920 by the Fisher brothers and S. Thorburn, and this was re-enacted in 2013 by Kevin Biggar and Jamie Fitzgerald in series 2 of the "First Crossings" TV series.

A mid-20th century proposal to dam the river for hydroelectricity was rejected.

References

External links
 First Crossings TV series links: TV One, Facebook page and website

Rivers of the Bay of Plenty Region
Rivers of the Gisborne District
Rivers of New Zealand